The Jeddah Flagpole is a flagpole in King Abdullah Square in Jeddah, Saudi Arabia.

The cylindrical flagpole was built of 500 tons of steel in September 2014 by the Abdul Latif Jameel Community Initiative and Al-Babtain Power & Telecom. The flagpole sections were lifted into place by a Liebherr LR 1750 crawler crane with a 182-meter boom operated by Gulf Haulage and Heavy Lift Company.

Record holders previous to the Dushanbe flagpole included the  National Flagpole in Azerbaijan and the  Panmunjeom Flagpole of Kijŏng-dong in North Korea.

The Jeddah Flagpole is located in the center of King Abdullah Square, surrounded by 13 lights that represent the 13 governorates of Saudi Arabia. The 26,000-square-meter park, also known as "Custodian of Two Holy Mosques Square", is located next to Jeddah's North Corniche. One-third covered with plants, it  represents the two swords and palm tree, the emblem of Saudi Arabia.

References

Buildings and structures in Jeddah
Flagpoles
Buildings and structures completed in 2014
2014 establishments in Saudi Arabia